Santa Gertrudis (Spanish equivalent of Saint Gertrude) may refer to:

Places

Canada
Santa Gertrudis-Boca del Infierno Provincial Park, in British Columbia

Mexico
Santa Gertrudis, Coahuila, a town in Coahuila state
 Santa Gertrudis, Chihuahua, a town and Air Force base in Saucillo Municipality in the state of Chihuahua
 Santa Gertrudis, Oaxaca, a town in the state of Oaxaca
Santa Gertrudis (municipality): municipality centred on that town
Santa Gertrudis, Veracruz, village in Veracruz, birthplace of Rafael Hernández Ochoa
 Santa Gertrudis de Carbonera, former name of Villa Juárez, San Luis Potosí
 Misión Santa Gertrudis, a mission in the state of Baja California Sur

Spain
 Santa Gertrudis de Fruitera, a town in the municipality of Santa Eulària des Riu, Eivissa

United States
Santa Gertrudis Independent School District, school district in  Kingsville, Kleberg County, Texas
Santa Gertrudis de Lo de Mora, early name of Mora, New Mexico

Other uses
 Santa Gertrudis cattle, a breed of cattle from Texas, United States

See also
Santa Gertrudes, a municipality in São Paulo, Brazil